Atomic Records a former independent-music store in Milwaukee, Wisconsin, started trading in 1985. It became one of the oldest and best-known record-stores in the Milwaukee area before going out of business on March 15, 2009.

References

External links
 Official homepage of Atomic Records.
 Atomic Records' page on StylusCity

Music retailers of the United States
Culture of Milwaukee
Economy of Milwaukee
American companies established in 1985
Retail companies established in 1985
Retail companies disestablished in 2009